is a town located in Niigata Prefecture, Japan. , the town had an estimated population of 7,926, and a population density of 22.2 persons per km2. The town is famous for its hot springs.

Geography
Yuzawa is located in southwestern Niigata Prefecture, in a mountainous area bordering northern Nagano Prefecture and northern Gunma Prefecture. Due to its geographical location between the Sea of Japan and the surrounding Japanese Alps it has one of the highest annual snowfalls in Japan. There are numerous ski resorts within the region. Mount Naeba (2143 meters) is partly located within the town limits. Much of the town is within the borders of either the Jōshin'etsu-kōgen National Park or the Uonuma Renpo Prefectural Park.

Surrounding municipalities
Niigata Prefecture
Minamiuonuma
Tōkamachi
Tsunan
Nagano Prefecture
Sakae
Gunma Prefecture
Nakanojō
Minakami

Climate
Yuzawa has a Humid continental climate (Köppen Dfa) characterized by warm, wet summers and cold winters with heavy snowfall.

Demographics
Per Japanese census data, the population of Yuzawa has declined over the past 30 years.

History
The area of present-day Yuzawa was part of ancient Echigo Province. Yuzawa, Mikuni, Kandatsu, Tsuchidaru, and Mitsumata merged on 1 April 1955 to become the town of Yuzawa.

Education
Yuzawa has one public elementary school and one public middle school operated by the town government. The town no longer has a high school.

Transportation

Railway
 – Jōetsu Shinkansen
  - 
 JR East - Jōetsu Line
  -  - Echigo-Yuzawa -  
 Hokuhoku Express - Hokuhoku Line
Echigo-Yuzawa

Highway
 Kan-Etsu Expressway

Local attractions

Ski resorts
There are a large number of ski resorts in the area. The town is served by the Echigo-Yuzawa and Gala-Yuzawa stations on the Jōetsu Shinkansen line, making it one of the most easily accessible winter sports areas from Tokyo, and the town's economy is reliant principally on skiing and snowboarding.

Cultural references

Yasunari Kawabata's classic novel Snow Country takes place in Yuzawa.

See also
 Takahan Ryokan an historic inn located in Yuzawa

References

External links

Official Website 

 
Towns in Niigata Prefecture
Spa towns in Japan